Charlie Joe Finney (born 28 October 2003) is an English professional footballer who plays as a midfielder for Chorley on loan from EFL League Two side Crewe Alexandra.

Career
The younger brother of former Crewe midfielder Oliver Finney, Charlie Finney came through Crewe Alexandra's Academy, signing his first professional deal in July 2021.

He made his Crewe debut on 9 August 2022, starting alongside his brother in Crewe's EFL League Cup first round defeat at Grimsby Town. He made his first league appearance on 13 September 2022, supplying the cross for Dan Agyei's equaliser in a 1–1 draw at Hartlepool United. 

On 4 March 2023, he joined National League North play-off chasers Chorley on an initial one-month loan deal.

Career statistics

References

2003 births
Living people
English footballers
Association football midfielders
Crewe Alexandra F.C. players
Chorley F.C. players
English Football League players